Laurence Geoffrey Aberhart (born 1949) is a New Zealand photographer.

Biography
Aberhart was born in Nelson in 1949, along with three siblings, and was educated at Nelson College from 1963 to 1966. He moved to Lyttelton in the late 1960s, before finally moving to Russell where he still lives and works today. Aberhart travels often and has produced many collections of photographs taken around the world. Although he photographs numerous subjects, Aberhart is best known for his photography of buildings from around the world. His subject matter includes Masonic lodges, war memorials, houses and the occasional landscape. However, when he was typecast as a building photographer, Aberhart took a series of human portraits to debunk the stereotype.

Aberhart trained to become a primary teacher and it was around that time when he first became interested in photography by reading the photographic books on display and seeing a friend working in the darkroom. Aberhart taught himself photography. After finishing his teaching course, he was posted in Northland. This was his only posting as a teacher and soon after he took up photography seriously. Aberhart has three children, who were the subject of a series of photographs in the 1980s, but is unmarried.

Photographic style and works
Aberhart's work is prominent in New Zealand and he is often seen as one of the forefathers of New Zealand's contemporary photographic history. He has been featured in many photographic exhibitions since 1978; his work has been shown in museums across the globe, including Australia, the United States and France. In addition to numerous photographic exhibitions across New Zealand, Aberhart was Artist In Residence at the Tylee Cottage Residency, Wanganui in 1986 and the Dunedin Public Art Gallery in the late 1990s.

Aberhart bought an old camera to begin photographing. However, soon after he began using it in the late 1960s, the paper used to print the negatives on went out of production as well. Aberhart has been known to use platinum prints when developing photographs, but also uses other paper such as silver gelatine prints. Owing to this unusual photographic process, each print would take in excess of eight hours to fully develop in Aberhart's darkroom. In addition, the time between Aberhart taking the photo and actually developing it was in some instances large; he would often develop photographs years later. Indeed, in one instance, he waited from 1978 until the early 2000s to develop one photograph.

Aberhart was fairly limited in his subject matter, sticking mainly to Māori carvings, buildings, museology and memorials. However, feeling pressed by others' perception that he was typecast, he released a series of photographs of his children in the 1980s. Perhaps his most expensive and memorable prints are the "Prisoner's Dream" series of five photographs. At the centre of the series is Mount Taranaki. This picture is special due to its long exposure time of over five hours. This was caused by Aberhart's absence to take a 'nap', but he didn't awaken until a while later. The whole photograph was lit by moonlight and was nearly thrown out as rubbish by Aberhart when he realised how long it had been exposed for. This is one of his most expensive photographs.

References

External links
Works at the Museum of New Zealand Te Papa Tongarewa
Biography and works, Sarjeant Gallery
Biography, exhibitions and series of work from Laurence Aberhart.
Biography from Darren Knight Gallery

1949 births
Living people
20th-century New Zealand artists
New Zealand photographers
People educated at Nelson College
People from Russell, New Zealand
21st-century New Zealand artists
20th-century New Zealand male artists
21st-century New Zealand male artists
20th-century New Zealand photographers
21st-century New Zealand photographers